The Alternative to Love is the third album by American singer-songwriter Brendan Benson, released in 2005. The song Cold Hands (Warm Heart) was featured on the Bones episode A Boy in the Tree and the Smallville episode "Exposed". The song "What I'm Looking For" was sampled on an iPod Touch commercial, as well as in the film Ghost Town. This is the last solo album Benson released before beginning the project band The Raconteurs with fellow Detroit native Jack White of The White Stripes.

The track "Flesh And Bone" was used in series one of the E4 drama Skins.

Track listing 
All songs written by Brendan Benson.

 "Spit It Out" – 3:20
 "Cold Hands (Warm Heart)" – 3:25
 "Feel Like Myself" – 4:16
 "Alternative to Love" – 4:35
 "The Pledge" – 2:55
 "Them and Me" – 4:00
 "Biggest Fan" – 3:45
 "Flesh and Bone" – 2:55
 "Get It Together" – 3:32
 "Gold into Straw" – 3:43
 "What I'm Looking For" – 3:31
 "Between Us" – 3:12

References 

Brendan Benson albums
2005 albums
Albums produced by Tchad Blake
V2 Records albums